Nyctemera lugens is a moth of the family Erebidae first described by Walter Karl Johann Roepke in 1949. It is found on Sulawesi in Indonesia.

References

Nyctemerina
Moths described in 1949